Matthew Giuffre (born June 8, 1982) is a Canadian professional squash player. He reached a career high of 38 in the world. He represented his country in the Commonwealth Games.

References

1982 births
Living people
Canadian male squash players
Sportspeople from Edmonton
Competitors at the 2005 World Games
21st-century Canadian people